Túlio Henrique Gomes de Barros or simply Túlio (born February 28, 1987 in Olinda), is a Brazilian attacking midfielder. He currently plays for Sport.

Contract
1 February 2007 to 31 January 2008

External links
CBF

1987 births
Living people
Brazilian footballers
Sport Club do Recife players
Association football midfielders
People from Olinda
Sportspeople from Pernambuco